The Central Berkshire Regional School District is the largest school district (by area) in the state of Massachusetts, covering over 214 square miles. It serves seven towns, six in central Berkshire County, Massachusetts; Becket,  Dalton, Hinsdale, Peru, Washington, and Windsor; the seventh is the town of Cummington in Hampshire County, Massachusetts . The district has 3 elementary schools: Becket-Washington School (servicing the towns of Becket and Washington), Craneville (servicing the towns of Cummington, Dalton and Windsor), and Kittredge (servicing the towns of Hinsdale and Peru). The district has a regional Middle School (Nessacus) and High School (Wahconah) which are both are located in Dalton and service the entire district. As of the 2006–2007 school year, the district had 2,144  pupils enrolled in grades K-12.

References

External links
District Web Site

School districts in Massachusetts
Education in Berkshire County, Massachusetts
School districts established in 1958